The Bishop of Bangor is the ordinary of the Church in Wales Diocese of Bangor. The see is based in the city of Bangor where the bishop's seat (cathedra) is at Cathedral Church of Saint Deiniol.

The Report of the Commissioners appointed by his Majesty to inquire into the Ecclesiastical Revenues of England and Wales (1835) found the see had an annual net income of £4,464. This made it the second wealthiest diocese in Wales, after St Asaph.

The incumbent is Andy John, who was consecrated on 29 November 2008 and enthroned on 24 January 2009.

List of Bishops of Bangor

Pre-Reformation bishops

Bishops during the Reformation

Post-Reformation bishops

Bishops of the Church of England

Bishops of the disestablished Church in Wales

Assistant bishops

See also
Archdeacon of Bangor

References 

Bangor
 
Bangor, Gwynedd
Lists of Welsh people
Bangor
Lists of people by city in Wales